Tsat Tsz Mui or Braemar Point is a neighbourhood, formerly a village, east of North Point, in Hong Kong. It is centred on Tsat Tsz Mui Road.

Name
Tsat Tsz Mui in Cantonese means "seven sisters". There was a tragic story about them. Once upon a time, there lived a village of Hakka people. Seven girl playmates pledged to be sisters in their lifetime, die on the same day and never get married. One day, the third sister's parents decided to make her marry a man. She did not want to but dared not say a word against her parents. The day before the wedding, all seven sisters committed suicide at the sea shore. The next day, at the bay appeared seven rocks. The villages believed that they must be the seven sisters. The rocks were then named Tsat Tsz Mui Shek, Seven Sister Rocks, and the village Tsat Tsz Mui Tsuen, Seven Sister Village.

In 1934, the rocks were buried under the reclamation for urban development.

History
The 1819 edition of the Gazetteer of Xin'an County did not mention Tsat Tsz Mui, however, local residents emphasized Tsat Tsz Mui Village existed for hundreds of years. According to the census in 1849, Tsat Tsz Mui Tsuen had over two hundred inhabitants and over one hundred houses. It was also a popular swimming spot.

At the time of the 1911 census, the population of Tsat Tsz Mui was 297. The number of males was 193.

A large residential property named 'Seven Sisters' was built on the hillside above present-day North Point in approximately 1923.

Housing
Two public housing estates are located in Tsat Tsz Mui: Model Housing Estate, the oldest existing public housing estate in Hong Kong, with several blocks completed in 1954, and Healthy Village.

See also
 Tin Chiu Street

References